Prentice Almont "Pidge" Browne Jr. (March 21, 1929 – June 3, 1997) was an American professional baseball player. That year, as a member of the first-ever Houston Colt .45s squad, he participated in another unusual feat, representing a Houston-based professional baseball team at three different levels — Double-A (with the 1956–57 Houston Buffaloes of the Texas League), Triple-A (with the 1959 and 1961 Buffs of the American Association) and MLB (with the 1962 Colt .45s, known as the Astros since ).

Browne was from Peekskill, New York and attended Peekskill High School, where he dropped out in May 1946 to join the United States Navy. He served for two years.

He spent much of his minor league career in the farm system of the St. Louis Cardinals and belted 190 home runs over the course of his 13 years in the minors. His two best seasons occurred back to back in the Texas League, when he hit 33 home runs for the 1955 Shreveport Sports, an unaffiliated team, then 29 more homers in 1956 for the Cardinals' Houston Buffaloes affiliate.

Acquired by the Colt .45s for their first season in the National League, he made his debut on April 19, 1962, as a pinch hitter for pitcher Turk Farrell; batting against Jack Hamilton of the Philadelphia Phillies, Browne grounded out to second baseman Tony Taylor. Six days later, Browne started at first base for Houston against the Chicago Cubs and got his first MLB hit, a triple off Don Cardwell. He would appear in 65 games played for the Colt .45s through the end of July, 15 as a starting player. His best day came May 6 on the road against the Milwaukee Braves, when Browne had three hits, including his only Major League home run, in five at bats and scored three runs in a 9–1 Houston win. He was sent to the Triple-A Oklahoma City 89ers to finish the 1962 season, and he retired at the end of that campaign.

Browne worked in the freight business after his retirement from baseball, and died in Houston at age 68 in 1997. He is buried at 
Earthman Resthaven Cemetery in Houston.

References

External links

1929 births
1997 deaths
Allentown Cardinals players
American expatriate baseball players in Cuba
Baseball players from New York (state)
Columbus Jets players
Denver Bears players
Habana players
Hamilton Cardinals players
Houston Buffaloes players
Houston Buffs players
Houston Colt .45s players
Los Angeles Angels (minor league) players
Major League Baseball first basemen
Mobile Bears players
Oklahoma City 89ers players
Omaha Cardinals players
Peekskill Highlanders players
People from Peekskill, New York
Shreveport Sports players
United States Navy sailors